Heteropsis drepana is a butterfly in the family Nymphalidae. It is found on Madagascar. The habitat consists of forests.

References

Elymniini
Butterflies described in 1850
Endemic fauna of Madagascar
Butterflies of Africa